Steve Perry (born 1949) is a recording artist and the former lead singer of the band Journey.

Steve or Stephen Perry may also refer to:
Steve Perry (author) (born 1947), science fiction author
Stephen R. Perry (born c. 1950), legal scholar and professor of law and philosophy at the University of Pennsylvania
Steve Perry (Oregon musician) (born 1963), lead singer of the Cherry Poppin' Daddies
Stephen Perry (inventor) (19th century), British inventor and businessman
Stephen Perry (writer) (1954–2010), American writer for the Thundercats cartoon and comic book
Steve Perry, pseudonym of pornographic actor Ben Dover
Steven Perry (born 1988), American soccer player
Steve Perry (baseball), first-round pick of the L.A. Dodgers in 1979
 Steve Perry, multiple medalist at the World Quizzing Championships
Stephen Joseph Perry (1833–1889), English Jesuit and astronomer
Stephen Samuel Perry (1825–1874), collected historical manuscripts related to Texas history

See also
 Stephen Parry (disambiguation)